Westralunio is a genus of freshwater mussels in the family Hyriidae.

There are 3 species:
 
Westralunio albertisi  Clench, 1957
Westralunio carteri  Iredale, 1934 – Carter's freshwater mussel
Westralunio flyensis  (Tapparone-Canefri, 1883)

References

Hyriidae
Bivalve genera
Taxonomy articles created by Polbot